Berend (von) Wetter-Rosenthal (8 November 1874, Tallinn – 10 March 1940 Krughof ( Kijazkowo), Reichsgau Wartheland, Nazi Germany) was a Baltic-German politician. He was a member of I Riigikogu. He was a member of the Riigikogu since 10 January 1923. He replaced Georg Rudolf Stackelberg.

References

1874 births
1940 deaths
People from Tallinn
People from Kreis Harrien
Baltic-German people
German-Baltic Party politicians
Members of the Riigikogu, 1920–1923
Saint Petersburg State University alumni
Humboldt University of Berlin alumni
Estonian emigrants to Germany